Darkness Descends is the second studio album by the American thrash metal band Dark Angel, released on November 17, 1986. Released at the height of thrash metal's popularity, Darkness Descends received positive reviews from music critics, and has been cited as a major influence on the death metal, doom metal and groove metal scenes of the late 1980s and 1990s.

Overview
Though bassist Rob Yahn appears on the album, Mike Gonzalez received credit in the liner notes. Darkness Descends was Dark Angel's final album to feature original vocalist Don Doty. The album is the first to feature influential drummer Gene Hoglan.

The song "Darkness Descends" is about the comic book characters known as the Dark Judges from the Judge Dredd comic book series, and even contains their famous statement, "this city is guilty, the crime is life, the sentence is death."

"Death Is Certain (Life Is Not)" deals with euthanasia.

"Black Prophecies" deals with Nostradamus.

"Perish in Flames" deals with a nuclear apocalypse.

"The Burning of Sodom" deals with the biblical story of Sodom and Gomorrah.

"Merciless Death" is a re-recording of a song from Dark Angel's previous album We Have Arrived.

Reception

In August 2014, Revolver placed Darkness Descends on its "14 Thrash Albums You Need to Own" list. Decibel Magazine placed it 9th on its "50 Greatest Thrash Metal Albums of All Time." "Loudwire" placed "Darkness Descends" at number 6 on its "Top Ten Thrash Albums NOT  Released by the Big 4" list.

Track listing

Icarus Records 2010 remastered bonus tracks

Darkness Descends on Philadelphia - DFA Live at the Trocadero, October 23, 1988

Darkness Descends on Reseda - DFA Live at the Country Club April 22, 1989

Personnel
Dark Angel
Don Doty – vocals
Eric Meyer – lead guitar, engineer
Jim Durkin – lead guitar
Rob Yahn – bass, engineer (bass recording)
Gene Hoglan – drums
Ron Rinehart – vocals on the live recordings
Mike Gonzalez – bass on the live recordings

Production
Randy Burns – producer, engineer
Casey McMackin – engineer

References

Dark Angel (band) albums
1986 albums
Combat Records albums